Parmotrema awasthii is a species of foliose lichen in the family Parmeliaceae. Found in India, it was described as new to science in 2003.

See also
List of Parmotrema species

References

awasthii
Lichen species
Lichens described in 2003
Lichens of India
Taxa named by Dalip Kumar Upreti
Taxa named by Pradeep Kumar Divakar